The Wigan Warriors play Rugby League in Wigan, England. Their 2012 season results in the Super League XVII and 2012 Challenge Cup are shown below.

Super League

Regular season

Matches

Source:

Table

Play-offs

Source:

Challenge Cup

After finishing second in the Super League XVI, Wigan Warriors entered the 2012 Challenge Cup at the fourth round. Their opening game saw them thrash North Wales Crusaders by 94 points. A win in the fifth round against Featherstone Rovers saw them beat derby rivals St Helens in the quarter finals before losing to their other rivals, Leeds Rhinos, in the semi-finals.

References

2012
Wigan Warriors season